The Veneziaspitze is a mountain in the Ortler Alps on the border between South Tyrol and Trentino, Italy.

References 
 Peter Holl: Alpenvereinsführer Ortleralpen, 9. Auflage, München 2003, 
 Eduard Richter (Redaktion): Die Erschließung der Ostalpen, II. Band, Verlag des Deutschen und Oesterreichischen Alpenvereins, Berlin, 1894
 August Petermann Geographische Mittheilungen, Ergänzungsheft 27, Gotha 1869
 Casa Editrice Tabacco, Udine: Carta topografica 1:25.000, Blatt 08, Ortles-Cevedale/Ortlergebiet

External links 

Mountains of the Alps
Mountains of South Tyrol
Alpine three-thousanders
Ortler Alps